Andres Ignacio Campos Gonzalez (born 15 September 1996) is a Chilean professional boxer.

Professional boxing career

Early career
Campos made his professional debut against Guillermo Dejeas on 10 August 2018. He won the fight by unanimous decision, with scores of 40–35, 39–37 and 40–35. Campos next beat Luis Gonzalo Sucasaca Pari by unanimous decision on 19 October 2018, Marcos Emilio Villafane by unanimous decision, on 25 January 2019 and Claudio Lavinanza by split decision on 30 March 2019.

Campos faced Agustin Francisco David Leiton on 5 July 2019. He won the fight by a second–round technical knockout. It was the first knockout victory of his professional career.

Campos faced Ramon Velasquez on 5 July 2019, at the Alto San Francisco in Santiago, Chile, in what was his first ten-round bout. He only needed six rounds however, as Velasquez opted to retire from the fight before the seventh round.

Campos faced Ritesh Gaunder on 23 November 2019, at the Seagulls Rugby League Club in Tweed Heads, Australia, in his first professional bout outside of Chile. He won the six–round fight by unanimous decision, with all three judges awarding him every single round.

Secondary titlist
Campos faced Jesus Martinez for the vacant WBA Fedebol flyweight title on 21 December 2019, at the Gimnasio Municipal in Lo Barnechea, Chile. Campos won the nine round bout by unanimous decision, with scores of 881/2–841/2, 89–93 and 88–831/2. 

Campos made the first defense of his secondary title against the undefeated Pedro Villegas on 14 March 2020, at the Gimnasio Club Mexico in Santiago, Chile. Aside from being Campos' first title defense, the vacant WBO Latino flyweight title was likewise on the line. Campos won the fight by unanimous decision, with scores of 98–91, 97–92 and 95–94. He scored the sole knockdown of the fight in the sixth round, dropping Villegas with two consecutive body shots.

After capturing his first two professional titles, Campos fought a rematch with Ramon Velasquez on 12 March 2021, at the Gimnasio Municipal in Lo Barnechea, Chile. The fight was contested in an empty venue, due to restrictions imposed to combat the COVID-19 pandemic. Campos won the fight by unanimous decision, with all three judges scoring the bout 98–91 in his favor. Velasquez was deducted a point in the ninth round for a headbutt. Following this victory, the WBO ranked Campos as the sixth best flyweight in the world. It was the first time that a major world championship group had ranked him in their top ten.

Campos made the second defense of his secondary WBA and the first defense of his secondary WBO title against Sebastian Gomez Sanchez on 4 December 2021, at the Estadio Municipal in Lo Barnechea, Chile. He won the fight by unanimous decision, with scores of 97–92, 98–91 and 100–89. He expressed his desire to fight the reigning WBO flyweight champion Junto Nakatani in his post-fight interview, stating: "I hope next year to be fighting for the world title. We are just one step away".

Campos faced Javier Martinez on 27 February 2022, in the main event of an ESPN Knockout card, which will take place at the Las Clavelinas Hotel y Eventos in Ingeniero Maschwitz. He won the bout by a fourth-round knockout, stopping Martinez with a left hook to the body at the 1:26 minute mark. Campos became the first fighter from Chile to win a professional fight in Argentina.

Campos was booked to make his second WBO Latino flyweight title defense against the former WBA World minimumweight interim champion Jesús Silvestre on 11 June 2022, at the Gimnasio Municipal in Lo Barnechea, Chile. He won the fight by unanimous decision, with scores of 100–90, 99–91 and 96–94. 

Campos made his third WBO Latino title defense against Gilberto Pedroza on 14 August 2022. He retained the title by unanimous decision, with scores of 97–92, 97–92, and 96–93. Pedroza was deducted point for headbutting in the eight round. His manager Toni Tolj stated in the post-fight press conference: "The plan is to get another title defense before the end of the year. Andres, myself and (promoter) Nicolas (Martinez) will all head to the WBO Convention in Puerto Rico in October finish off 2022 in style with another step up in competition".

Professional boxing record

References

Living people
1996 births
Chilean male boxers
Sportspeople from Santiago
Flyweight boxers